The 2008 MLS Supplemental Draft was held on January 24, 2008, six days after the 2008 MLS SuperDraft, as teams filled out their developmental rosters.

Changes from 2007
 2008 expansion club San Jose Earthquakes received the first pick in each round.

Round 1

Round 1 trades

Round 2

Round 2 trades

No trades reported.

Round 3

Round 3 trades

Round 4

Round 4 trades

References 

Major League Soccer drafts
Mls Supplemental Draft, 2008
MLS Supplemental Draft